Adi Kesava Temple is dedicated to Hindu god Vishnu located in Mylapore, Chennai, in the South Indian state of Tamil Nadu. Constructed in the Dravidian style of architecture, dedicated to Vishnu, who is worshipped as Sri Adi Kesava Perumal and his consort Lakshmi as Mayuravalli Thayar. The temple is believed to be the birthplace of Peyalvar, one of the first three of the twelve Alvar saints of the 6th-9th century CE.

Chithra Kulam, the temple tank is believed to be of historic origin and one of the major rainwater storage facility in the region. The float festival celebrated during the Tamil month of Thai is a very prominent festival of the temple. The temple is open from 5 a.m. to 11 a.m. and 5 p.m. to 8 p.m and has six daily rituals at various times of the day. The temple is maintained and administered by the Hindu Religious and Endowment Board of the Government of Tamil Nadu.

Legend

As per Hindu legend, during the churning of the Ocean of milk, Vishnu instructed his consort Lakshmi to reach the hermitage of Sage Bhrigu. The sage was doing a penance to attain a girl child, and accepted Lakshmi as his daughter. The presiding deity, Adi Kesava, is believed to have married goddess Bharghavi, the daughter of sage Bhrigu.

The temple is believed to be the birthplace of Peyalvar, one of the first three of the twelve Alvar saints of the 6th-9th century CE. The legendary Alvar was believed to have come to earth from the  well called Manikairavam inside the temple premises. In modern times, the temple tank as a store house for rain water harvesting for the nearby areas. The temple tank is believed to be 4,000 years old and was desilted for the first time in 2016. The float festival in the temple was celebrated from 2005 and 2016 and was not celebrated later due to dry tank due to clogging of the canals leading to the tank.

The temple

It is located in Mylapore, in Chennai, the capital of the South Indian state of Tamil Nadu. The presiding deity is housed in the sanctum and is an image made of granite. The deity is seen in standing posture. The shrine of Garuda faces Adi Kesava, the eagle mount (Vahana) of Vishnu. The central shrine is approached through a worship hall and a narrow Ardha Mandapam. The flagpost ("Dhwaja sthambam") is located behind the shrine of Garuda. There are images of Alvars in the worship hall on both sides and the shrine of Mayuravalli is located on the western side of the temple in the second precinct. In modern times, the temple is maintained and administered by the Hindu Religious and Charitable Endowments Department of the Government of Tamil Nadu.

Worship practices and festivals

The temple is open from 7 a.m. to 11 a.m. and 5 p.m. to 8 p.m. The temple priests perform the puja (rituals) during festivals and on a daily basis. As at other Vishnu temples of Tamil Nadu, the priests belong to the Vaishnavaite community. The temple rituals are performed four times a day: Ushathkalam at 8 a.m., Kalasanthi at 10:00 a.m., Sayarakshai at 5:00 p.m. and Ardha Jamam at 7:00 p.m. Each ritual has three steps: alangaram (decoration), neivethyam (food offering) and deepa aradanai (waving of lamps) for both Sri Aadi Kesava Perumal and his consort Sri Mayuravalli Thayar. During the worship, religious instructions in the Vedas (sacred text) are recited by priests, and worshippers prostrate themselves in front of the temple mast. There are weekly, monthly and fortnightly rituals performed in the temple.

The temple procession takes place during the ekadasi day, Tiruvonam, the occasions of the full moon and the new moon, when the festival images (utsavar) of  Adi Kesava, Sridevi, and Bhudevi are taken in a procession. There are different processions taken by Mayuravalli Thaayaar on Fridays and Uthiram star, Andal on the Pooram star, Rama on Punarpoosam,  and the Alvars, on their birthdays.  Brahmotsavam, the main festival of the temple is performed during the Tamil month of Panguni.  During the ten-day festival, the twelve Alvars and the twenty-one Vaishnava Acharyas are taken in procession along with Adi Kesava perumaaL. During the Tamil month of Aadi, float festival (theppothsavam) is conducted for five days. The temple is maintained and administered by the Hindu Religious and Endowment Board of the Government of Tamil Nadu.

Religious importance
The goddess Mayuravalli is worshipped with Bilva leaves, which is otherwise used only in Shiva temples. Shiva, Parvati, and Lakshmi in the form of Mayuravalli are believed to have worshipped Adi Kesava Perumal and got relieved off their curses. It is believed that Pey Alvar was taught by goddess Mayuravalli. Following the legend of the temple, the temple is frequented by devotees praying for their education and also for getting a good married life. The temple and Kapaleeshwarar Temple are the oldest extant monuments in Mylapore.

See also
Madhava Perumal Temple, Mylapore

References

External links

Hindu temples in Chennai